General elections were held in Saint Vincent and the Grenadines on 7 April 1972. The result was a tie between the People's Political Party and the Saint Vincent Labour Party, which both won six seats. Despite being a former member of the SVLP (which had received a majority of the public vote), the sole independent MP James Fitz-Allen Mitchell formed a government with the PPP. Voter turnout was 75.6%.

Results

References

Saint Vincent
Elections in Saint Vincent and the Grenadines
1972 in Saint Vincent and the Grenadines